First Things First is Bob Bennett's first release.  It was released about three years after he became a Christian.

Track listing
All songs written by Bob Bennett, except where noted.

"Carpenter Gone Bad?" – 3:32
"The Night Shift" – 6:34
"Whistling In The Dark" – 2:31
"The Best" – 3:45
"You're Welcome Here" – 3:31
"Forgive And Forget" – 2:48
"(I Know That) My Redeemer Lives" (text: Samuel Medley; Tune: "Duke Street", John Hatton; adap. Bob Bennett) – 3:16
"The Garden Song" – 3:46
"I Belong To You" – 3:57
"Healings" – 4:49
"Spiritual Equation" (CD bonus track) – 2:18

Additional tracks on 2007 release
<li>"Spiritual Equation" (acoustic version, re-release CD) – m:ss
<li>Track by track commentaries (acoustic version, re-release CD) – m:ss

Personnel
 Bob Bennett – acoustic guitar, Vocals, composer
 Jim Fielder – acoustic bass
 Ron Tutt – drums
 Alex MacDougall – percussion
 Bob Sanders – baritone horn
 Nils Oliver – cello
 Terry Winch – flugelhorn
 Darrel Gardner – flugelhorn
 Bill Alsup – French horn
 Ron Loofbourrow – French horn
 Val Johnson – trombone
 Phil Ayling – woodwinds
 John Phillips – woodwinds
 Jonathan David Brown – producer, recording, mixing
 James Gabriel – horn/woodwind arrangement on Track 7 ("My Redeemer Lives")

Release history
First Things First was originally released on LP and cassette in 1979.  In the early 1990s it was released on CD; where that release contained an additional track, "Spiritual Equation".  After being out of print for many years, in 2007 Bob Bennett arranged for a limited twenty-fifth anniversary edition; in addition to the original "bonus track", the 2007 release also contains an acoustic version of "Spiritual Equation" and newly recorded song by song commentaries.

References

Bob Bennett (singer-songwriter) albums
1979 albums